Fredrik Johansson may refer to:

 Fredrik Johansson (ice hockey) (born 1984), Swedish professional ice hockey centre
 Fredrik Johansson (cyclist) (born 1978), Swedish professional racing cyclist
 Fredrik Johansson (electronic sports player) (born 1984), aka MaDFroG, Swedish WarCraft III player
 Fredrik Johansson (musician), former member of melodic death metal band Dark Tranquillity
 Fredrik Johansson (bandy) (born 1984), Swedish bandy player
 Fredrik Johansson (orienteer) (born 1986), Swedish orienteering competitor
 Fredrik Johansson (speedway rider), a Swedish ice speedway rider, see 2010 Individual Ice Racing World Championship
 Fredrik Johansson (ski jumper) (born 1974), Swedish Olympic ski jumper
 Fredrik Johansson (Holby City), a fictional character from British medical drama Holby City